Cibali may refer to:

 , a neighbourhood of Catania, Italy
 Stadio Cibali, a sports stadium
 Cibali, İspir, a place in Erzurum Province, Turkey
 , a neighbourhood of Fatih, Istanbul, Turkey

See also 
 Chibali (disambiguation), entities in Kashmir
 Cibalia, a Croatian football club